The Pantheon of Illustrious Sailors is a mausoleum and memorial to all the mariners of the Spanish Navy, especially prominent ones, and to the Spanish Navy and all its ships, battles and explorations in general. The term Pantheon is a concession to the generally prevalent and popular style of neoclassical architecture, which is supposed to have begun explicitly in the 18th century, but was in use long before then in the Renaissance, a "rebirth" of classical civilization, especially in decorative ornamentation.

The application of "Pantheon" in this case is entirely superficial. The building is composed of two layers: a Catholic church to which a cemetery has been added by enclosure and roofing. The church projects above the roof of the building, while the cemetery appears as projections off the nave. The philosophic term Pantheon comes from a different, polytheistic religion. Etymologically, it refers to a panoply of "all the gods." Christianity, however, is considered a monotheistic religion, despite the Trinitarian subdivision of divinity into three persons. As each person is fully God, and is not lessened by division, the Trinity is described as a mystery.

The application of the term to the building, however, is entirely architectural. The Spanish architects who assigned the term believed they were creating a type of building, which, in the 18th and 19th centuries, was termed a Pantheon, because of the central dome. The earliest extant instance of a large domed structure is the Pantheon of Rome. Originally a pagan temple, it utilized the principle of the arch to support a heaven-like surface over a public chamber, the rotunda. Geometrically a dome is an arch rotated about a central axis, so whatever load-bearing advantage an arch has is multiplied over the dome. The Roman Pantheon survived because it was quickly converted into a Christian church, like many other pagan public buildings. Domes became a standard feature of state and religious buildings thereafter. Their sudden labelling as Pantheons in the 18th century is no doubt a neoclassicism, and there are others, such as a few frontal columns. The architecture, however, is primarily church architecture, none of which dates to classical times.

Military community of San Carlos
The Spanish naval pantheon is located in Poblado Naval de San Carlos, historically the Población Militar de San Carlos, in the Province of Cádiz, Andalusia, Spain. The "population" part of the name can be any community in English. Here it means district, whether naval or military, which would be covered by the general English term, "base." The base is continuous with the city of San Fernando, on the north side of it, except for the security barriers delimiting the base. The post office, the telephone company, and the "population" consider the base as part of the city. However, it never was in any municipal sense. The Población was there first, and was named San Carlos. It was treated as a town. San Fernando grew to the south of it, on land not on the base. They were both on an island, a slight elevation in the wetlands, the Isla de León, on the Bay of Cádiz. The land and structures of the base were acquired by, and are administered by, the national government, today the Ministry of Defence. For example, in the military legal system, the base is the headquarters of Juzgado Togado Militar Territorial Nº 22, "Territorial Military Court District Number 22," comprising Cadiz, with an address of Poblado Naval de San Carlos San Fernando (Cádiz).

Like any base of any country, the units at the base, their function in the military, the facilities available, and the relationships to the civilian community, change frequently as the military is brought up to date. Whether the base is the Población Militar de San Carlos, or the Poblado Naval de San Carlos, or just plain San Carlos, and whether it is on land belonging to San Fernando, or the Defense Department, are ongoing controversies not likely to be settled soon. These changes all affected the architecture and accessibility of the Pantheon one way or another.

The reservation was created from crown lands in the late 18th century by the last absolute monarch of the Spanish Empire at its peak, Carlos III, who had other dominions than Spain. He donated the land for a base he considered an absolute necessity for the defense of Cadiz and of Spain, and then died. Without the base, Cadiz, placed on a long spit of land enclosing the Bay of Cadiz, would be easily surrounded and cut off. The base was part of a general plan of walls and fortifications in and around Cadiz. Carlos III had already chosen as their patron saint, Charles Borromeo, the counter-reformation saint, who did his best to reform the church and lure the Protestants back into it, even sending a mission to Switzerland, origin point of the Swiss reform, to invite the Protestants there to return to the Catholic Church. For his successes in partially restoring the church, Charles Borromeo was recognized as San Carlos. The successor of Carlos III on the latter's death issued an order that the incomplete works were to be named San Carlos in honor of Carlos III. The latter, of course, was no saint himself. San Fernando was not recognized as a town until the early 19th century.

The judgement of Carlos III turned out to be perspicacious and sound as, a generation after his death, 12,000 Spanish with some English and Portuguese held Cadiz against a French force of 70,000 under Napoleon in the Siege of Cádiz. All the rest of the country had fallen. When the French were gone, the savants who had congregated at Cadiz suggested a Constitution for a limited monarchy, but it was rejected by the monarch. San Carlos, however, entered a new ascendance in the structure of the military. It became the seat of the Spanish Naval Academy and the headquarters of the Spanish marines, with the Pantheon in a new role as chapel. In 1943 the Naval Academy moved to Pontevedra. The role of San Carlos after 1943 seemed to decline. San Fernando has been lobbying to take over its lands for commercial development, a goose laying a golden egg for some interests, as former bases are in many countries, especially the United States.

The issue came to a head in 2018, when all the old wisdom of Carlos III was reaffirmed. The Ministry of Defence (Ministerio de Defensa) firmly reasserted its claim over the previous land of the base, and more. In April of that year the Council of Ministers (Consejo de Ministros) declared the Población Militar de San Carlos, using those words, as a "Zone of Interest for National Defense" (Zona de Interés para la Defensa Nacional). On 12 June the Royal Decree (Real Decreto) was published in the Official State Gazette (Boletin Oficial del Estado, BOE). Previously  were considered in the poblacion; now, somewhat more were to be included in the zone. The naval base to the north was brought in, and any nearby air space. The decree was more specific, giving coordinates of the zone and listing military rights over it. No action could be taken, or any regulation or statute passed, no transfer of property, or any new use, could be originated without express permission of the Ministry of Defense. National Defense must take priority.

Architecture of the building
Unlike many prominent buildings, this one was not built in a single style for a single purpose; it evolved during the more than two hundred years of its existence. The various terms that have been used to describe it are not always apt, especially when they are translated into English.

Structural elements
The main structural elements used in the Illustrious Sailor's Pantheon are the arch, the vault, and the dome, all of which were in use in classical times, but generally not to the degree of elaboration shown in the great cathedrals and capitols of the Renaissance and after. The classical uses were, in turn, derived from the elaboration of a single, simple device: the wedge. Wedges were among the first tools devised by mankind, such as cutters, scrapers, and especially axes.

The wedge interposes the compression-resistant properties of its solid-state structure to change the direction and strength of a vector force transmitted by it. In the figure, the axeman imparts a momentum to the blade which, impacting the wood, generates a force acting at P along the length of the blade. The force does not leave in that direction because there is no bearing surface there. Instead, the force departs at right angles to the bearing surfaces at Q, forcing the wood apart and imparting momentum to any chips that fly off.

The angle of intersection of the bearing surfaces is subtended by an arc at a. Suppose the wood is removed and a number of axes are placed face-to-face, and that P is a static gravitational load. The arc is extended to an arch, while Q is diverted along the arch, leaving a force-free space below it. The forces at Q, however, must ultimately be countered or the arch will fly apart and collapse. If they are countered, the forces act to compress the wedges. The compressional strength of stone is very high. The alternative structure to an arch, the lintel, or beam across the top of the opening, as in the many prehistoric henges, must support the load in a different way. Every horizontal beam must sag under a load. When it does, the length must extend, subjecting the lintel to tensile forces. As the tensile strength of stone is much lower, the lintel under heavy loads typically breaks and collapses. Many arches survive from antiquity, but few lintels are still in place.

Composition

The inner and earliest Pantheon is a classic example of church architecture of the Renaissance, a time when the cathedral structure reached its floruit. Small churches continued with the typical form evolved from a Roman house: a nave, or hall for the congregation with rows of seats; an apse, or special area facing the nave for the choir, the sacraments, statues or other images, and a stained glass window if one could be afforded, and the bema, a preaching pulpit inserted between in a lofty position appropriate to the power and authority of the church, believed to derive from the power and authority of God himself. Large churches, on which large amounts of cash could be expended, either private or public, took a more grandiose form along cathedral lines. The Pantheon is of the grandiose, expensive type, rather than the country-church, thrifty type. Home churching remained outside the pale in Spain. In Switzerland the great churches had been abandoned and stood vacant as monuments to vanity and corruption while the people worshipped in humble homes. This latter philosophy was never allowed to get started in Catholic Spain. The Inquisition stood in the way.

For Carlos III, the initiator of the project, there was never any choice. He needed a grandiose church of the old style to reaffirm the power and authority of the empire of which he alone was the absolute monarch. The grandeur of the church would be the glory of Spain. Typically of the absolute monarchs on the very doorstep of the Age of Revolution he had little thought for the cash he would have to outlay to obtain the outward form of the glory, to be the divine luminary on Earth shining benevolently over all mankind, if not as the son of God himself (as the ancient absolute monarchs had claimed) then at least as the sun of the Son. Reality would soon bring them all up short, as it had already done in Britain, and was about to do in the American colonies of Britain and in France.

After the death of Carlos III, Carlos IV (considered inept if not mentally deficient) was faced with a choice, a form of "guns or butter." The country needed to rearm for the conflicts the military advisors knew were coming. They had no money for expensive symbols of a glory now in question. Work on the cathedral was scaled down, then it was abandoned. San Carlos became not a town in need of a place to worship but a base in need of fortification. The basic form of the cathedral was in place. If it had been completed along traditional lines the exterior would have shown vaults and arches with perhaps flying buttresses and a great dome in the center. That external form was never to be.

By the time work on the building was resumed in the mid-19th century, it had different purposes and the architects had a different plan in mind. It was not a community cathedral now, but the chapel of the Spanish Naval Academy. Like naval academy buildings elsewhere it had a maritime monumental aspect. It would celebrate the history of the Spanish Navy and its mariners. The midshipmen would worship steeped in that history, as is appropriate for its students. The architects were guided more by the design of the first Mausoleum, a building celebratory of the transition to divinity and eternity.

The structure thus became one building within another. The inside walls form a splendid cathedral with arches, vaults, and domes (a main and some subsidiary), embellished with frescoes and larded with Baroque ornamentation. The monuments to the illustrious dead are tucked into every spare corner and corridor. Tons of gold and silver hang from the ceiling or rise from the floor as though in some expensive cave. The exterior building, in contrast, is a rectanguloid block with stark walls. There is no sign of any arch, vault, or dome. Even the superstructure on the roof over the domes is blocklike. At least the Pantheon of Rome gives the visitor an external dome to view, a hint of the dome to be seen within. The various domed capitol buildings of the world offer as much of a show on the outside as they do on the inside. In the Pantheon of Illustrious Mariners, the main show is interior. The exterior exists only to support it. All the buttressing required is thus hidden between the walls or in the overhead. To the outside the exterior walls present a few circular, empty-looking windows, like the dead eyes of a skull. The front portico with neo-classical columns and a pediment seems similarly empty and detached. The main use of the structure today is as a tourist attraction. It celebrates an empire that was but is no more.

Ornamentation
In addition to the architectural features, which pertain to the structure of the building, the monument contains numerous purely ornamental features, some decorative elaboration of the walls and arches, others fixed, semi-fixed or portable additions. These latter include works of art of great aesthetic or cultural value, many of great monetary value. Most have some symbolic meaning with regards to the theme of the monument, which is basically, like most Christian religious monuments, "the church triumphant." The fact that the illustrious mariners earned their triumph by self-sacrificing words and deeds saves the monument from any such shallow and anti-Christian conclusion that only the rich go to heaven. Rather, character overcomes status, wealth, and power. The gravestones, which are more individualized, are considered in a subsequent section.

Brief history of the building
San Fernando Island, as it now is called, is an island in the wetlands between the Bay of Cadiz and the Atlantic Ocean. It conveys the highway out to Cadiz, but much of it is of sufficient elevation to sustain buildable land, which today it totally built over. The rest is marsh, channels, and fine beaches. This wetlands site was always occupied, although marginally, by some persons of the same culture that occupied Cadiz. That was Phoenician at first, Roman next, Vandal-Roman next, Moorish-Vandal next, and finally in 1492, the year Columbus sailed to America, Spanish, as Ferdinand and Isabella took Andalusia from the Moors and finally expelled them, along with the Jews, from Spain. Columbus is believed by some to have fought before Granada, the last Moorish stronghold.

Mariners honored
Numerous distinguished Spanish mariners are interred here or have monuments honouring them. The government policy was only to place officers in the monument, but in some cases enlisted men were included anonymously in groups of remains known to have included the captain, and in at least one case the crown intervened to memorialize under his own name a seaman who had died for his country of wounds inflicted during an intense sea battle (see below). In the mausoleum part of the monument, there is something like a tomb of the unknown sailor, a pool commemorating all those buried at sea, and a dedication to all mariners everywhere regardless of rank or educational status who served in the Spanish Navy.

Of mariners called out by name, the following incomplete list includes:

Juan Cervera Valderrama
José María Manuel Céspedes y Pineda
Francisco Chacón Medina Salazar
Cosme Damián de Churruca y Elorza
Gabriel Císcar y Císcar
Christopher Columbus
Víctor María Concas y Paláu
José de Córdoba y Rojas
Luis de Córdova y Córdova
Juan de la Cosa
Manuel Deschamps Martínez
Juan Domingo Deslobbes y Cortés
Segundo Díaz de Herrera y Serrano
Juan Díaz de Solís
José Luis Díez y Pérez Muñoz
Juan Manuel Durán González
Manuel Emparán de Orbe
Antonio de Escaño y García de Cáceres
José Esguerra y Guirior
Cesáreo Fernández Duro
Tomás Geraldino Geraldino
Nicolás Geraldino Sutón
José Goicoa Labart
José González Hontoria
Federico Carlos Gravina y Nápoli
Julio Guillén Tato
Juan Antonio Gutiérrez de la Concha
Mateo Hernández Ocampo
Luis Hernández Pinzón y Álvarez
Francisco Herrera Cruzat
Baltasar Hidalgo de Cisneros
Jaime Janer Róbinson
Jorge Juan y Santacilia
Ángel Laborde Navarro
Rafael De Laiglesia Darrac
José María Lazaga y Ruiz
Blas de Lezo
Santiago Liniers y Bremond
Miguel Lobo y Malagamba
Ferdinand Magellan
Alejandro Malaspina Melilupi
José Malcampo y Monge
Francisco de Paula Márquez y Roco
Cripiano Mauleón Godoy
Ignacio María Mendizábal Vildosola
Casto Méndez Núñez
Augusto Miranda Godoy
Francisco Moreno Fernández
Salvador Moreno Fernández
Francisco Antonio Mourelle de la Rúa
Juan José Navarro de Viana y Búfalo
José Navarro Torres
Pedro Novo y Colson
Nicolás Otero Figueroa
Martín Alonso Pinzón
Vicente Yáñez Pinzón
Rosendo Porlier y Astiegueta
Andrés Reggio Brachiforte
Francisco Riquelme Ponce de León
José Rodríguez de Arias y Álvarez Campana
Juan Ruiz de Apodaca y Eliza
Francisco Javier de Salas y Rodríguez-Morzo
Blas Salcedo y Gutiérrez del Pozo
Victoriano Sánchez Barcáiztegui
Pedro Pablo Sanguineto Basso
José de la Serna y Occina
José Solano y Bote
Zenón de Somodevilla y Bengoechea
Vicente Tofiño de San Miguel y Vandelvalle
Joaquín Toledo y Parra
Antonio de Ulloa y de la Torre-Giralt
Francisco Javier de Uriarte y Borja
Cayetano Valdés y Flores
Juan Varela Ulloa
Casimiro Vigodet y Garnica
Fernando Villaamil y Fernández Cueto
Juan María de Villavicencio y la Serna
Francisco Javier Winthuysen y Pineda
Antonio Yepes Arigori
Joaquín Zarauz Santander

Gallery of gravestones

Footnotes

External links

Buildings and structures in San Fernando, Cádiz